The Super Bowl of Poker (also known as Amarillo Slim's Super Bowl of Poker or SBOP) was the second most prestigious poker tournament in the world during the 1980s.  While the World Series of Poker was already drawing larger crowds as more and more amateurs sought it out, the SBOP "was an affair limited almost exclusively to pros and hard-core amateurs."

Prior to 1979, the only high dollar tournament a person could enter was the WSOP.  1972 WSOP Main Event Champion and outspoken ambassador for poker, Amarillo Slim saw this as an opportunity.  "The World Series of Poker was so successful that everybody wanted more than one tournament," he said.  Slim called upon his connections and friendships with poker's elite to start a new tournament in the February 1979.  Slim modelled his SBOP after the WSOP with several events and a $10,000 Texas Hold'em Main Event.

One of the principal differences between the WSOP and the SBOP was the prize structure.  The WSOP's prize structure was flat ensuring more people received smaller pieces of the prize pool.  The SBOP typically used a 60-30-10 payout structure.  In other words, only the first three places received money and generally in the ratio of 60% to first place, 30% to second place, and 10% to third.  This payment schedule predominated the SBOP for the first 5 years of the event, but as the event grew the number of payouts increased while keeping the payout schedule top heavy.

1981 Tournament

The 1981 SBOP was one of the most anticipated poker events in the 1980s.  In 1980, Welcome Back Kotter's lead actor, Gabe Kaplan had won the SBOP Main Event.  His victory proved that anybody could play poker.  Because of his popularity as an actor, people were eager to see how the returning actor would fare in the 1981 event.

Billy Baxter, a Poker Hall of Famer won the Ace-to-Five Lowball event while fellow Hall of Famer Johnny Moss won the $5,000 Seven Card Stud event.

Key

Event 1: $ 10,000 No Limit Hold'em 

 Number of buy-ins: 26
 Total prize pool: $260,000
 Number of payouts: 3
 Reference:

Event 2: Ace-to-Five Lowball 

 Number of buy-ins: 44
 Total prize pool: $44,000
 Number of payouts: 3
 Reference:

Event 3: $ 400 Ladies Seven Card Stud 

 Number of buy-ins: 31
 Total prize pool: $12,360
 Number of payouts: 3
 Reference:

Event 4: $ 1,000 Ace to Five Lowball  

 Number of buy-ins: Not Recorded
 Total prize pool: Not Recorded
 Number of payouts: 3
 Reference:

Event 5: $ 1,000 Seven Card Stud 

 Number of buy-ins: 39
 Total prize pool: $39,000
 Number of payouts: 3
 Reference:

Event 6: $ 1,000 Hold'em 

 Number of buy-ins: 67
 Total prize pool: $67,000
 Number of payouts: 3
 Reference:

Event 7: $ 5,000 Seven Card Stud 

 Number of buy-ins: 19
 Total prize pool: $95,000
 Number of payouts: 3
 Reference:

Event 8: $ 1,000 Razz 

 Number of buy-ins: 17
 Total prize pool: $17,000
 Number of payouts: 3
 Reference:

Event 9: $ 10,000 Deuce to Seven Lowball 

 Number of buy-ins: 9
 Total prize pool: $90,000
 Number of payouts: 3
 Reference:

Event 10: $ 500 Limit Hold'em 

 Number of buy-ins: 146
 Total prize pool: $73,000
 Number of payouts: 3
 Reference:

Event 11: $ 2,500 Seven Card Stud Hi/Lo Split 

 Number of buy-ins: 12
 Total prize pool: $30,000
 Number of payouts: 3
 Reference:

Event 12: $ 1,000 Hold'em "Follow the Stars" 

 Number of buy-ins: unknown
 Total prize pool: $73,400
 Number of payouts: 3
 Reference:

References

Super Bowl of Poker
1981 in poker